Both Sunni Muslims and Shia Muslims agree on the three Holiest sites in Islam being, respectively, the Masjid al-Haram (including the Kaaba), in Mecca; the Al-Masjid an-Nabawi, in Medina; and the Al Aqsa Mosque compound, in Jerusalem.

Both the Umayyad Mosque in Damascus and the Ibrahimi Mosque in Hebron have been considered the fourth holiest site in Islam.

Furthermore, Sunni Muslims also consider sites associated with Ahl al-Bayt, the Four Rightly Guided Caliphs and their family members to be holy.

Kaaba
 The Kaaba (Arabic: The Cube) is the most sacred site in Islam. It is surrounded by the Masjid al-Haram. During the Hajj period, the mosque is unable to contain the multitude of pilgrims, who pray on the outlining streets. More than 2 million worshippers gather to pray during Eid prayers.

According to the teachings of Islam, Allah, used the word mosque when referring to the sites established by ʾIbrāhīm (Abraham) and his progeny as houses of worship to God centuries before the revelation of the Quran. Before Mecca and Jerusalem came under Muslim control between 630 CE and 638 CE, the site of the Kaaba, which (according to Muslim belief) was established by Ibrahim and Ismail.

Al-Masjid an-Nabawi

Al-Masjid an-Nabawi (Arabic: المسجد النبوي) or the Mosque of the Prophet, located in Medina, is the second holiest site in Islam.

The Mosque was originally the house of Muhammad; he settled there after his migration to Medina, and later built a mosque on the grounds. He himself shared in the heavy work of construction. The original mosque was an open-air building. The mosque also served as a community center, a court, and a religious school. There was a raised platform for the people who taught the Quran. The basic plan of the building has been adopted in the building of other mosques throughout the world.

Subsequent Islamic rulers greatly expanded and decorated the mosque. The most important feature of the site is the green dome over the center of the mosque, where the tomb of Muhammad is located. Constructed in 1817 CE and painted green in 1839 CE, it is known as the Dome of the Prophet. Early Muslim leaders Abu Bakr and Umar are buried beside Muhammad.

Medina is also home to the historically significant Quba Mosque and Masjid al-Qiblatayn.

Al-Aqsa Mosque

Masjid Al-Aqsa ("the Farthest Mosque"), also known as the "Al Aqsa compound", is a holy site in Shia and Sunni Islam and is located in the Old City of Jerusalem, and is widely regarded by Jews as the Temple Mount, the site of the Holy Temple. It includes the Qibli mosque and the Dome of the Rock. It is the third holiest site in  Islam. The term Al-Aqsa Mosque was coined in the Quran:

Al-Aqsa Mosque is sacred because the "first of the two qiblas" was Jerusalem. In Islamic tradition, Al-Aqsa is said to be the "second mosque", as well as the "third of the holy sanctuaries", under Islamic Law.

The term used for mosque, masjid, literally means "place of prostration", and includes monotheistic or more specifically Abrahamic places of worship but does not exclusively lend itself to physical structures but a location, as Muhammad stated "The earth has been made for me (and for my followers) a place for praying...". When Caliph Umar conquered Jerusalem after Muhammad's wafat, a prayer house was built on the site. The structure was expanded by the Umayyad caliph Abd al-Malik ibn Marwan and finished by his son al-Walid in 705 CE. The building was repeatedly destroyed by earthquakes and rebuilt, until the reconstruction in 1033 by the Fatimid caliph Ali az-Zahir, and that version of the structure is what can be seen in the present day. This same area was called at later Islamic periods as the Haram al-Sharif or the "Noble Sanctuary". The Dome of the Rock is almost unanimously accepted to be the area from where Muhammad is said to have ascended to heaven, although a few fringe theories claim it had been from a mosque in Medina, Jir'ana or Kufa.

Although most political references to the Al-Aqsa Mosque date from the 12th century or later due to its occupation by the Crusades, others claim that the mosque's position in Islam is firmly grounded in a number of hadith dating from the birth of Islam.

While Jerusalem is not mentioned by name in the Quran, it is recognized as a sacred site based on several references that have been linked to Jerusalem by later Islamic traditions such as the hadith. Some academics attribute the holiness of Jerusalem to the rise and expansion of a certain type of literary genre, known as al-Fadhail or history of cities. The Fadhail of Jerusalem inspired Muslims, especially during the Umayyad period, to embellish the sanctity of the city beyond its status in the holy texts. Others point to the political motives of the Umayyad dynasty which led to the sanctification of Jerusalem in Islam.

Later medieval scripts, as well as modern-day political tracts, tend to classify al-Aqsa Mosque as the third holiest site in Islam. For example, Sahih al-Bukhari quotes Abu Darda as saying: "the Prophet of God, Muhammad said a prayer in the Sacred Mosque (in Mecca) is worth 100,000 prayers; a prayer in my mosque (in Medina) is worth 10,000 prayers; and a prayer in al-Aqsa Mosque is worth 1,000 prayers", more than in any other mosque. In addition, the Organisation of Islamic Cooperation, refers to the al-Aqsa Mosque as the third holiest site in Islam (and calls for Arab sovereignty over it).

Umayyad Mosque 

Umayyad Mosque in Damascus is considered by some Muslims to be the fourth holiest site in Islam. One of the four authorized copies of the Quran was kept here, and the head of Yahya ibn Zakariyya is believed to be in the shrine. 

The Minaret of Isa in the Umayyad Mosque is dedicated to Isa (Jesus), and it is believed that he will return to the world at the minaret during the time of a Fajr prayer and it is believed that he will pray at the mosque with the Islamic leader of that time Mahdi. It is believed that prayers in the mosque are considered to be equal to those offered in Jerusalem.

Ibrahimi Mosque 

Ibrahimi Mosque in Hebron, West Bank, Palestine, contains the graves of the Prophet Abraham and some of his family, and is for that reason also considered by some Sunni Muslims the fourth holiest site in the world. It was said that Muhammad himself encouraged the activity, saying "He who cannot visit me, let him visit the Tomb of Abraham" and "He who visits the Tomb of Abraham, Allah abolishes his sins."

Tombs of Biblical prophets
 Tomb of Daniel (Daniyal) - contains the grave of Islamic prophet Daniel
 Nabi Habeel Mosque in Syria - contains the grave of Abel (Arabic: Habeel), son of Adam and Eve, the mosque was built by the Ottoman governor of the Damascus Eyalet, Ahmad Pasha ibn Ridwan.
 Great Mosque of Aleppo in Aleppo, Syria - contains the remains of Prophet Zechariah, father of John the Baptist.
 Al-Nabi Yusha' in Upper Galilee, Israel - Tomb of prophet Joshua
 Tomb of Noah

Other places 
 Quba Mosque - is the mosque located outside the Medina, was the first ever constructed mosque by Muhammad.
 Cave of Hira is located on the mountain called Jabal al-Nour, is the cave where the first verses of the Quran were revealed to Muhammad.
 Masjid al-Qiblatain in Medina, Saudi Arabia - is the mosque where the direction of prayer (qibla) was changed from Jerusalem to Mecca.
 Al-Baqi' is the oldest Islamic cemetery, where Caliph Uthman, Fatimah, Caliph Hasan ibn Ali and Aisha were buried.
 Imam Ali Mosque is the mosque where Caliph Ali ibn Abi Talib was buried.
 Imam Husayn Shrine is the mosque where Imam Husayn ibn Ali, and his relatives such as Abbas ibn Ali, Ali al-Akbar ibn Husayn, Ali al-Asghar ibn Husayn, Habib ibn Muzahir, and other martyrs of Karbalā were buried.
 ʾIbrāhīm, son of Musa al-Kazim - the direct descendant of the Islamic prophet Muhammad and Caliph Abu Bakr.

 Eyüp Sultan Mosque is the türbe of Abu Ayyub al-Ansari in Istanbul, Turkey built by the Ottoman Sultans.

See also
 Holy city
 Holiest sites in Islam
 Destruction of early Islamic heritage sites in Saudi Arabia

Footnotes

References
 Aghaie, Kamran Scot (2004). The Martyrs of Karbala: Shi'i Symbols and Rituals in Modern Iran. University of Washington Press. 
 (In Arabic)
Shimoni, Yaacov & Levine, Evyatar (1974). Political Dictionary of the Middle East in the 20th Century. Quadrangle/New York Times Book Co.
 

 

Islamic pilgrimages